Thirtysomething is  an American drama television series created by Edward Zwick and Marshall Herskovitz for United Artists Television (under MGM/UA Television) and aired on ABC from September 29, 1987, to May 28, 1991. It focuses on a group of baby boomers in their thirties who live in Philadelphia, Pennsylvania, and how they handle the lifestyle that dominated American culture during the 1980s given their involvement in the early 1970s counterculture as young adults. It premiered in the United States on September 29, 1987, and lasted four seasons. It was canceled in May 1991 because the ratings had dropped. Zwick and Herskovitz moved on to other projects. The series won 13 Primetime Emmy Awards, out of 41 nominations, and two Golden Globe Awards.

On January 8, 2020, ABC confirmed that a television pilot, which would serve as a sequel to the series, had been ordered. The pilot was never filmed, but was set to be directed by Zwick, written by Zwick and Herskovitz, and have four members of the original cast (Olin, Harris, Busfield and Wettig) reprising their roles. In June 2020, ABC passed on the series.

General plot and characters
Although seen as an ensemble drama, the series revolves around husband and wife Michael Steadman (Ken Olin) and Hope Murdoch (Mel Harris) and their baby Janie. Michael's cousin is photographer Melissa Steadman (Melanie Mayron), who used to date his college friend Gary Shepherd (Peter Horton). Gary eventually marries Susannah (Patricia Kalember). Michael's business partner is Elliot Weston (Timothy Busfield), who has a troubled marriage with his wife Nancy (Patricia Wettig), a painter. Hope's childhood friend is local politician Ellyn Warren (Polly Draper).

Character descriptions
 Michael Steadman and Hope Murdoch Steadman: Hope is from Philadelphia, and Michael is from Chicago but remained in the area after graduating from the University of Pennsylvania. Hope is a graduate of Princeton and a consumer affairs writer. After having their daughter Janie, Hope becomes a stay-at-home mother and initially gives up her writing. Later, she returns to work but struggles with her role as a mother in the process. During a difficult period in her marriage when she is pregnant with her second child, Leo, Hope contemplates having an affair with environmentalist John Dunaway (J. D. Souther). Michael's confrontation with her over this leads them to resolve their problems and rekindle their marriage. Michael is Jewish, and Hope is Christian, and complications from their interfaith marriage recur throughout the series. Michael's original ambition was to be a writer, but he works in advertising with graphic designer Elliot. The men first meet at the Bernstein Fox ad agency and then leave to form The Michael and Elliot Company. When their company goes bankrupt, Michael and Elliot join the advertising corporation DAA, run by Miles Drentell. Michael's relationship with Miles erodes his marriage with Hope, who finally decides to accept a job in Washington, D.C. By the time the show was canceled, Michael had decided to quit work altogether so that Hope could pursue her own interests.
 Elliot Weston and Nancy Krieger Weston: Elliot studied graphic design at Rhode Island School of Design (RISD). His father Charlie (Eddie Albert) is divorced from Elliot's mother and now lives in California. Elliot's sister Ruthie (played by Meagen Fay), who lives in Philadelphia and is married with two children, hasn't forgiven their father for leaving them. Elliot works in the advertising business with Michael (initially in their own business, but later for DAA). Nancy was also an art major and is a stay-at-home mother to Ethan and Brittany. Like Hope, she initially feels bored and unhappy in her role as a homemaker. After Elliot has an affair which leads to divorce proceedings, Nancy develops a career as a children's book illustrator and author, and begins teaching at a local art center. Elliot becomes jealous after she also begins to date and finds himself once again attracted to her. Eventually, they rekindle their relationship and stop divorce proceedings. During the final two seasons, Nancy struggles with, but ultimately overcomes, ovarian cancer, which deepens their relationship. Always a rebel, Elliot can never reconcile himself to Miles' preference for Michael and his own loss of creative work at DAA, and eventually quits DAA in a fit of rage against both Miles and Michael. He and Nancy move to California, where he finds his passion in directing and eventually makes up with Michael when they accidentally bump into each other during Michael's job interview at TBWA\Chiat\Day. Michael does not accept the job but briefly entertains the possibility of working again with Elliot to make commercials (and turns again to Miles for help in this endeavor). At the time the show was canceled, it is implied that this venture will not happen after Michael tells Hope that he will stop working so that she can pursue her own interests.
 Melissa Steadman: Michael's cousin and Gary's former girlfriend, who studied photography at New York University (NYU). Her work as a photographer includes the cover of a Carly Simon album and photos in Vanity Fair. Melissa has a complicated relationship with Michael, who is frequently jealous of her career path. She has an equally complicated relationship with her mother, Elaine (Phyllis Newman), and grandmother, Rose (Sylvia Sidney). Her free-spirited sister, budding actress Jill, lives in New York (and is portrayed by Mayron's sister Gale Mayron). In the first season, Melissa dates a divorced gynecologist who has a daughter (played by Kellie Martin) who doesn't want more children. Melissa later briefly dates Michael's boss Miles; this relationship ends when his intense attraction to her nearly evolves into date rape, which she prevents and for which he apologizes. Miles never really recovers from his infatuation, but Melissa works to avoid him thereafter. Art school-dropout house painter and twenty-something Lee Owens (Corey Parker) becomes the primary focus of her romantic yearnings. They are drawn to each other, but their relationship is fraught with problems, mostly due to the age difference. After Melissa convinces Michael and Elliot to find Lee a job at DAA, the couple begins to drift apart and eventually breaks up. At the time of the show's cancellation, they are on friendly terms again, and Gary's "ghost" (as he recently died in a car accident) tells Michael that Lee and Melissa will marry and have a child.
 Ellyn Warren: Hope's childhood friend. Ellyn is an important local politician who works at City Hall. Initially dating her co-worker Steve Woodman (Terry Kinney), she later becomes involved with a married man, Jeffrey Milgrom (Richard Gilliland), who leaves his second wife for her but eventually abandons her and goes back to his first wife. After the breakup, Ellyn develops a new friendship with Gary, whom she used to dislike. Annoyed by Michael and Hope's perpetual interference in their lives, Gary and Ellyn play a practical joke on them, implying that they are having an affair. The joke ends when Ellyn reveals she is once again involved with Billy Sidel (Erich Anderson), a comics artist and friend of Michael and Hope's, who set them up on a blind date. Ellyn had dumped him while still seeing Jeffrey, but after they break up she bumps into Billy, and they begin to spend time together. Initially unsettled by Billy's genuine and straightforward manner, Ellyn grows to love him. Afraid of his growing feelings for Ellyn, Billy has a one-night stand with a former girlfriend that temporarily damages his relationship with Ellyn. They eventually work through issues related to fear and trust, and marry in a ceremony at Michael and Hope's house, held after Gary's death.
 Gary Shepherd and Susannah Hart: Gary, who first met Michael when they were in the same freshman dorm at University of Pennsylvania, is a free-spirited, womanizing professor of medieval literature at a Philadelphia college, and Melissa's ex-boyfriend. When denied tenure, he thinks about becoming a social worker and meets Susannah, who works for a social welfare nonprofit. Susannah, who later admits to being shy and introverted, is initially an outcast among Gary's friends but develops a working relationship with the group to make Gary happy. Susannah and Gary move in together after she becomes pregnant with Emma and then marry before Susannah moves to New York for a new job. Gary stays in Philadelphia as he has found a new teaching position there that he doesn't want to give up, even though it requires him to teach American poetry. He falls into the role of a stay-at-home dad after the move and becomes more deeply involved in his new teaching position. He turns to Nancy for help when he is assigned a course in children's literature and does not know what to teach. Among the books Nancy recommends is Through the Looking-Glass, but she no longer owns a copy of it. Gary is on his way to visit Nancy in the hospital with a copy of the book as a gift when he is killed in a car accident. Michael, who initially can't let go of Gary, is "haunted" by his ghost, who comes back to Michael through a mirror (looking glass). Michael learns to respect Susannah (who stands up to his controlling nature) as they turn to each other to cope with Gary's passing.
 Miles Drentell (David Clennon): Michael and Elliot's corrupt boss at DAA who styles himself as a type of Zen master. Miles is a Vietnam veteran who was once a photographer passionate about art but eventually sold out. By the time Eliot and Michael meet him, Miles is a ruthless and extremely powerful businessman whose complete lack of ethics propels Michael into periods of self-reflection and depression. Michael's internal conflict deepens after Miles promotes him, forcing Michael to also sell out. Clennon reprised this role in the series Once and Again (1999–2002).
 Russell Weller (David Marshall Grant) is a gay friend of Melissa's who met her while she was photographing a wedding. They became fast friends due to their mutual interest in art. His relationship with Peter Montefiore (Peter Frechette) in the 1989 episode "Strangers" was the subject of controversy as five of the show's regular sponsors pulled out of the episode, costing the network approximately $1.5 million in advertising revenue. It eventually led producers to refrain from sexualizing their gay characters.

History

Episodes

Nielsen Ratings

Nielsen ratings/broadcast history

Home media
Shout! Factory (under license from MGM) has released all four seasons of Thirtysomething on DVD in Region 1.

Mill Creek Entertainment has rereleased the first season on DVD in two volumes. On January 18, 2011, it released Season One, Volume One, which contains the first 10 episodes of the season. Season One, Volume Two, which contains the remaining 11 episodes, was released on January 10, 2012.

In Region 2, Revelation Films released the first two seasons on DVD in the UK. Season 3 was briefly released in 2014, but was almost immediately withdrawn from sale for unspecified "contractual reasons" and has, to date, not been rereleased, nor has Season 4.

In Region 4, Shock Entertainment has released all 4 seasons on DVD in Australia.

Influences and cultural impact
Thirtysomething was influenced by the films Return of the Secaucus 7 (1980) and The Big Chill (1983). The show reflected the angst felt by baby boomers and yuppies in the United States during the 1980s, such as the changing expectations related to masculinity and femininity introduced during the era of second-wave feminism. It also introduced "a new kind of hour-long drama, a series that focused on the domestic and professional lives of a group of young urban professionals, a socio-economic category of increasing interest to the television industry [...] its stylistic and story-line innovations led critics to respect it for being 'as close to the level of an art form as weekly television ever gets,' as the New York Times put it." During its four-year run, Thirtysomething "attracted a cult audience of viewers who strongly identified with one or more of its eight central characters, a circle of friends living in Philadelphia." Even after its cancellation in 1991, it continued to influence television programming, "in everything from the look and sound of certain TV advertisements, to other series with feminine sensibilities and preoccupations with the transition from childhood to maturity (Sisters), to situation comedies about groups of friends who talk all the time (Seinfeld)."
The show also influenced the British television series Cold Feet, which featured similar storylines and character types. The creator of Cold Feet wanted his show to be in the mould of successful American TV series like Thirtysomething and Frasier.

Susan Faludi, in her bestseller Backlash (1991), argues that Thirtysomething often reinforced, rather than dismantled, gender stereotypes. She suggests that it exhibited a disdainful attitude toward single, working, and feminist women (Melissa, Ellyn, and Susannah) while at the same time "exalting homemakers" (Hope and Nancy). In this manner, the series was seen as "seemingly progressive but substantially conservative in its construction of reality."

Oxford English Dictionary
Almost immediately after the introduction of the show, the term "Thirtysomething" became a catchphrase used to designate baby boomers in their thirties. This cultural shift was reinforced by the Oxford English Dictionary, which added "Thirtysomething" in 1993 (under the word "thirty") and defined the term as follows:

Draft additions 1993 - n. [popularized as a catch-phrase by the U.S. television programme thirtysomething, first broadcast in 1987] colloq. (orig. U.S.) an undetermined age between thirty and forty; spec. applied to members of the ‘baby boom’ generation entering their thirties in the mid-1980s; also attrib. or as adj. phr. (hence, characteristic of the tastes and lifestyle of this group).

Honors and awards
While it aired, Thirtysomething was nominated for 41 Primetime Emmy Awards, winning 13. It also won two Golden Globe awards. Later, by 1997, "The Go Between" and "Samurai Ad Man" were listed as number 22 on TV Guides 100 Greatest Episodes of All Time. Thirtysomething then placed the number 19 spot on TV Guide′s 50 Greatest TV Shows of All Time in 2002, and in 2013, TV Guide placed it as No. 10 in its list of The 60 Greatest Dramas of All Time.

Sequel 
A sequel to the series was pitched in September 2019. The pilot was a co-production between MGM Television and Bedford Falls Productions, which was behind the original series, and ABC Studios, and producers were casting its four original main roles at the time of the announcement.

In February 2020, Chris Wood was cast as Leo Steadman, the show's male lead. Over the next few weeks, Odette Annable was cast as Janey Steadman and Patrick Fugit and Auden Thornton as Ethan Weston and Brittany Weston. Melanie Mayron and Polly Draper agreed to appear as Melissa Steadman and Ellyn Warren. On June 29, ABC decided not to move forward with the sequel.

References

Further reading

Articles
 
 
 
 
 
 
 
 
 
 
  Video.

Books
  A book that interviews the entire cast and writing staff of the series.

Scholarship

Screenplays

External links

 
 Remember 'thirtysomething'? Here's What Inspired One Of The Greatest TV Shows Of All Time (video interview). February 15, 2015.

1980s American drama television series
1987 American television series debuts
1990s American drama television series
1991 American television series endings
American Broadcasting Company original programming
Best Drama Series Golden Globe winners
English-language television shows
Television series about Jews and Judaism
Television series by MGM Television
Television shows set in Philadelphia
Peabody Award-winning television programs
Primetime Emmy Award for Outstanding Drama Series winners
Primetime Emmy Award-winning television series